The women's mass start race of the 2014–15 ISU Speed Skating World Cup 1, arranged in the Meiji Hokkaido-Tokachi Oval in Obihiro, Japan, was held on 16 November 2014.

Ivanie Blondin of Canada won the race, while Nana Takagi of Japan came second, and Irene Schouten of the Netherlands came third.

Results
The race took place on Sunday, 16 November, scheduled in the afternoon session, at 17:25.

References

Women mass start
1